, or stream climbing (sawa = stream; nobori = climb), is a type of mountaineering in Japan that involves going up mountain streams to their source.

Description 
The sport consists of ascending a tributary of a river along with its features, including climbing waterfalls, traversing ravine walls, and swimming through gorges. Shower climbing of waterfalls in the summer is a highlight. The difficulty of the climb can be judged by the level involved in rock climbing, with the use of ropes and protection, the amount of swimming involved, and the strength of the current. Many climbers pursue the target tributary until they reach its source, or the ideal finish is considered as such.

As a rule, the climber moves in the direction opposite the direction of the waterflow.

Although people used to climb with waraji (straw shoes), commonly used gear now includes special shoes with a felt sole, a climbing harness, a helmet, and ropes.

See also 
 Canyoning

External links 
 Kurobegawa, Japan Alps  
 Ogawadani, Tanzawa 

Mountaineering in Japan